The Homestead at Denison University (Granville, Ohio) is a student-run intentional community with a focus on environmental sustainability and voluntary simplicity.  Founded in 1977 under the guiding vision of biology professor Dr. Robert W. Alrutz, it is an evolving experiment in learning through living.  Membership is limited to twelve full-time students of Denison University per semester.  These students (referred to as “Homesteaders” or “Homies”) represent a variety of ages, backgrounds, and academic majors.

Description
In its core values and activities, The Homestead has much in common with intentional communities like Dancing Rabbit Ecovillage (Missouri), Sandhill Farm (Missouri), and Cobb Hill CoHousing (Vermont).  It differs from these communities in its direct connection to a liberal arts college, and its lack of long-term residents.  As all Homesteaders are students, their residencies last from one semester to three years.

The Homestead differs dramatically from typical college housing arrangements.  It has no television, and no internet access (Homesteaders visit the Denison main campus to use the internet).  Its structures and utilities are designed, built or installed, maintained, and improved by students (as feasible.)  It relies heavily on alternative and renewable sources of energy.  Technologies have included an off-the-grid photovoltaic system for limited electricity, wood stoves for heat and cooking, and passive solar design as another source of building heat.

Originally, three wooden cabins (built in 1977-78) served as residential spaces for the twelve Homesteaders. A strawbale cabin (named Cabin Bob in honor of Robert Alrutz, built in 1999-2001) serves as a kitchen and community center. An earthship named Cabin Phoenix was completed in 2009.

Homesteaders grow some of their own food, using organic gardens, orchards, beehives, and chickens (for eggs).  Manual labor is an integral part of life at The Homestead, as residents must haul and split wood, tend gardens and livestock, maintain and repair buildings, and cook.

Each resident must balance the responsibilities of being a Homesteader with those of being a student.  Homesteaders receive academic credit only for the annual Homestead Seminar (usually on sustainability issues) and for the summer internship program.

The Homestead Coordinator, a Denison employee, advises The Homestead on some of its decisions, and supervises some of its projects.  The Homestead Advisory Board (HAB) is composed of Homesteaders, The Homestead Coordinator, and university administration, faculty, and staff.  It oversees The Homestead's major decisions, and helps to integrate The Homestead with its parent university.  HAB helped to establish The Homestead May Term as an internship open to all Denison students and helps serve as an academic link to the Homestead.

History
The Homestead was the brainchild of Dr. Robert Alrtuz.  At a symposium in January 1976, Alrutz raised the idea of a student-run Homestead.  Afterwards, nine students approached Alrutz and expressed a desire to make the homestead dream a reality.  Alrutz and the students jointly prepared a formal proposal, and won approval (including a startup loan) from the board of trustees.

In the summer of 1977, students began construction of The Homestead.    They started building three wooden cabins, established a water-well, and grew a sizeable garden.  Alrutz supervised the project; the university physical plant and outside volunteers helped.  By late September 1977, all of the original eleven Homesteaders had moved into the first two still-unfinished cabins.  They installed insulation and wood stoves later that fall.

Homesteaders used oil lamps for interior lighting until 1982, when they installed a photovoltaic system.

The Homestead has remained an active community since its founding, although membership has varied from four residents to twelve.  The extent of on-site gardening and livestock-raising has varied with the interest of the students.  In the past ten years, The Homestead has undertaken two ambitious building projects: the strawbale Cabin Bob, and the earthship Cabin Phoenix.

Dr. Alrutz died in 1997, but the community he founded lives on.

2013 Projects 

After much planning, construction began on a new cabin in the Summer of 2013. In order to keep up with changing building codes, students, faculty, and administration agreed that the best way to maintain the viability of the Homestead in the future was a major update. The new cabin sits on the former site of Cabin 3, which was demolished in the Spring of 2013. Cabin 1 was also retired as a living space and will soon become and art and social space. The new cabin houses up to nine students, and combined with space for three in Cabin Phoenix maintains the capacity of twelve students.

The new cabin brings substantial advances in sustainable technology. Heat for all cabins is now generated by an external wood-gasification boiler and transmitted via underground hot water pipes. The cabin itself uses both a radiating retention tank and in-floor radiative heating. A new photovoltaic system was installed that generates more than 10 times the original electrical capacity and maintains a net output onto the grid. Furthermore, enhanced fire alarms and water suppression systems were installed in all residential cabins to prevent catastrophic fires.

To keep up with an evolving society, other sustainable conveniences were incorporated into the build, such as showers, laundry, and a composting toilet. Some changes have led to controversy among former residents, however, all such changes were made in concert with the original mission statement.

The Archive

In May 2012, the Homestead celebrated its 35th anniversary. This sizeable gathering of current and former homesteaders afforded the opportunity to collect, describe, digitize, and preserve the official archive of the Homestead. Joshua Finnell, humanities librarian in the William Howard Doane Library, in collaboration with Linda Krumholz, Associate Professor of English, received funding from an Andrew W. Mellon Next Generation Libraries grant to build the community archive. Several Homesteaders, including Ryan Culligan, Juan Pablo Torres, and Henry Jochem, helped build the archive during the summer of 2012. The complete archive was constructed, and is currently hosted, in the OhioLink Digital Resource Commons under a Creative Commons ShareAlike Copyright license.

References

Dodosh, Mark N. “Students find out how to be both rich and uncomfortable”, The Wall Street Journal. January 2, 1981.

Marcotty, Josephine.  “The Homestead.”  Dayton Daily News. Dayton, Ohio.  November 13, 1977.  pp. 1B
Murray, Cars. “Solar shines in licking”, The Denisonian.  October 8, 1982, page 5.
“New pioneers: Denison’s eco-throwbacks”, Columbus Monthly. March 1992. p. 12-13
Paprocki, Sherry Beck. “Homesteading, ‘90s’ style”, Beacon. January 5, 1992. p. 9, 13-15

Robinson, Sarah.  “Community spotlight: Bob Alrutz”, Granville Sentinel.  Granville, Ohio.  May 2, 1991.
“Students at Denison live on land”, Associated Press (AP). November 20, 1977.

External links
 The Homestead: official site
 The Homestead in the FIC Communities Directory
 The Homestead Archive

1977 establishments in Ohio
Denison University
Intentional communities in the United States